Mohammadlu may refer to:
 Mohammadlu, Ardabil
 Mohammadlu, Zanjan
 Mohammadlu, alternate name of Mohammad Shahlu, Zanjan Province